The 2000-01 Luxembourg Championship season was the fifth season of Luxembourg's hockey league. Three teams participated in the league, and Tornado Luxembourg won the championship.

Regular season

Final
Tornado Luxembourg 14 - Rapids Remich 0

External links
Season on hockeyarchives.info

Luxembourg Championship
Luxembourg Championship (ice hockey) seasons